Bahri Ishka (27 June 1944 - 9 January 2007) was an Albanian football player and coach.

Playing career

Club
Born in Tirana, Ishka played his entire career for 17 Nëntori Tirana and won 4 league titles with them under manager Myslym Alla and alongside national team players Skënder Hyka and Ali Mema.

International
He made his debut for Albania in a May 1964 FIFA World Cup qualification match against the Netherlands in Rotterdam and earned a total of 3 caps, scoring no goals.

His final international was an April 1967 European Championship qualification match against West Germany in Dortmund.

Managerial career
After retiring as a player, Ishka earned a degree in sports to become Prof. Dr. Bahri Ishka and he managed Albanian Superliga clubs Luftëtari Gjirokastër, Apolonia Fier, Traktori Lushnja, Skënderbeu Korçë and Dinamo Tirana.

Honours
Kategoria Superiore: 4
 1965, 1966, 1968, 1970

Albanian Cup: 1
 1963

References

External links

1944 births
2007 deaths
Footballers from Tirana
Albanian footballers
Association football forwards
Albania international footballers
KF Tirana players
Kategoria Superiore players
Albanian football managers
Luftëtari Gjirokastër managers
KF Apolonia Fier managers
KS Lushnja managers
KF Skënderbeu Korçë managers
FK Dinamo Tirana managers
Albania national under-21 football team managers
Kategoria Superiore managers